BHS may refer to:
 Back handspring
 Baggage handling system, in airports
 Bahamas, ISO 3166-1 alpha-3 code
 Beck Hopelessness Scale, a psychological test
 Biblia Hebraica Stuttgartensia, 1977 Hebrew Bible
 Breath-holding spell, a form of abnormal breathing mostly found in young children
 British Home Stores, a former retail store
 Buddhist Hybrid Sanskrit, a modern linguistic category
 IATA code for Bathurst Airport (New South Wales)

Organisations
 Bahamasair airline, ICAO code
 Barbershop Harmony Society, for barbershop music
 Beverly Hills Schools, 6th of October City, Egypt
 BHS, roller coaster manufacturer now part of Maurer Söhne
 British Herpetological Society, a professional association
 British Horse Society, a membership-based equine charity
 British Home Stores
 British Hydrological Society, a professional association
 Brooklyn Historical Society, US museum, library, and educational center

Schools

 Bakersfield High School, Bakersfield, California, United States
 Barrington High School, Barrington, Rhode Island, United States
 Beaverton High School (Beaverton, Oregon), Beaverton, Oregon, United States
 Bellevue High School, Bellevue, Washington, United States
 Bensalem High School, Bensalem, Pennsylvania, United States
 Bentonville High School, Bentonville, Arkansas, United States
 Berkeley Hall School, Los Angeles, California, United States
 Berkner High School, Richardson, Texas, United States
 Bernards High School, Bernardsville, New Jersey, United States
 Blackburn High School, Melbourne, Victoria, Australia
 Bloomfield Hall Schools, Pakistan
 Bluefield High School, Bluefield, West Virginia, United States
 Bluestone High School, Skipwith, Virginia, United States
 Boroughmuir High School, Edinburgh, Scotland, United Kingdom
 Bountiful High School, Bountiful, Utah, United States
 Boys' High School & College (Allahabad, Uttar Pradesh), Allahabad, India
 Braintree High School, Braintree, Massachusetts, United States
Brookline High School, Brookline, Massachusetts, United States
 Bupyeong High School, Incheon, South Korea
 Burnside High School, Christchurch, New Zealand
 Burnsville High School, Burnsville, Minnesota, United States